Hungarian Union may refer to:

Hungarian Union (Romania)
Hungarian Union (Serbia)